David Gross is an American theoretical physicist.

David Gross may also refer to:
David Gross (producer), Canadian film producer
David A. Gross (born 1954), American diplomat
David L. Gross, American historian
Dave Gross, game designer